Enter Arsène Lupin is a 1944 American film noir directed by Ford Beebe and starring Charles Korvin and Ella Raines. It features the French gentlemen thief Arsène Lupin, a creation of the writer Maurice Leblanc. Lupin keeps watch on a young woman whose jewels make a tempting target for a gang of thieves. It was made by Universal Pictures.

Plot
French jewel thief Lupin (Charles Korvin) robs an heiress (Ella Raines) on a train, then follows her to England and saves her life.

Cast
 Charles Korvin as Arsene Lupin 
 Ella Raines as Stacie Kanares 
 J. Carrol Naish as Ganimard 
 George Dolenz as Dubose 
 Gale Sondergaard as Bessie Seagrave 
 Miles Mander as Charles Seagrave 
 Leyland Hodgson as Constable Ryder 
 Tom Pilkington as Pollett 
 Lillian Bronson as Wheeler 
 Holmes Herbert as Jobson 
 Charles La Torre as Inspector Cogswell 
 Gerald Hamer as Doc Marling 
 Ted Cooper as Cartwright 
 Art Foster as Superintendent 
 Clyde Kenney as Beckwith
 Alphonse Martell as Conductor

See also
List of American films of 1944

External links
 
 
 

1944 films
American crime films
Arsène Lupin films
Films directed by Ford Beebe
Universal Pictures films
Films set in France
1944 crime films
American black-and-white films
1940s English-language films
1940s American films